Ron Harper (born 1964) is an American former basketball player.

Ron Harper may also refer to:

Ron Harper (actor) (born 1936), American actor
Ron Harper (politician) (born 1948), Canadian politician
Ron Harper Jr. (born 2000), American college basketball player